Gaius Valerius Paulinus was a Roman eques who flourished during the reign of the emperors Nero, and Vespasian. He was appointed to a series of imperial offices, including  praefectus or governor of Roman Egypt. Ronald Syme has strongly suggested that Paulinus is the father of the identically named Gaius Valerius Paullinus, suffect consul in 107.

Valerius Paulinus first appears in history during the Year of Four Emperors while procurator or overseer of the imperial properties in Gallia Narbonensis. As Tacitus tells us, following the defeat of the Othonian forces in the Battle of Bedriacum, Fabius Valens left Italy by ship to raise troops in Gaul. He put in at Hercules Monoecus (modern Monaco) where he learned Paulinus, who was a friend of Vespasian, was blocking his path inland. Valens sailed on, but was cast up by a storm on the Stoechades (modern Iles d'Hyeres, near Toulon). Here he was caught by surprise by some galleys sent after him by Paulinus, and captured. Paulinus sent him back to Italy, where he was executed.

When Vespasian emerged as the victor in this civil war, Paulinus was rewarded for his loyalty. He was first appointed Praefectus annonae, or overseer of the grain supply of Rome. From this position, Vespasian promoted him to prefect of Roman Egypt after Tiberius Julius Lupus died in office; Guido Bastianini dates his tenure to 74.

At this point Valerius Paulinus abruptly vanishes from history. It is possible he too died in office, or shortly after leaving it.

References

Further reading 
 Hans-Georg Pflaum, Les carrières procuratoriennes équestres sous le Haut-Empire romain I-III (Paris, 1961), No. 3

1st-century Romans
1st-century Roman governors of Egypt
Praefecti annonae
Roman governors of Egypt
Paullinus